Laceflower is a common name for several plants and may refer to:
 Ammi majus
 Daucus carota
 Orlaya sp.
 Ptilimnium nuttallii
 Tiarella trifoliata